Archbishop Victor Henry Thakur, born 1 July 1954 at Chakhni, Bihar is the serving archbishop of the Roman Catholic Archdiocese of Raipur.

Priesthood 
He was ordained as a catholic priest on 3 May 1984.

Episcopate 
He was appointed as Bishop of Bettiah on 27 June 1998 and ordained on 11 November 1998. He was appointed Archbishop of Raipur on 3 July 2013 and installed on 19 September 2013. He has served as Chancellor of the Diocese of Raipur and, as of 2017, is chairman of the education commission of the Bihar Regional Council of Bishops.

See also 
List of Catholic bishops of India

References

External links 

Living people
21st-century Roman Catholic archbishops in India
People from Bihar
1954 births